Myingyan is a township of Myingyan District in the Mandalay Division of Burma.

History
The Treaty of Yandabo which ended the First Anglo-Burmese War (1824–1826), was signed at Yandabo village in the township on 24 February 1826.

Geography

Villages
Myingyan Township contains 183 villages. A proportion of them are listed below:

   Aingma
   Aleywa
   Anein
   Aneintaunggyun
   Balon
   Chaungdaung
   Chaungdaung North
   Chaungdaung South
   Chaungle
   Chinbyitkyin
   Chize
   Daungthit
   Dulabo
   Duwun
   Gaunggwe
   Gwebinyo
   Gwegyo
   Hnatchodaw
   Kaing
   Kaingywathit
   Kalaywa
   Kanbu
   Kandaw
   Kangyaw
   Kanni
   Kanni
   Kanywa
   Kanzin
   Kanzwe
   Kan Pauk
   Khaungsin
   Kinmagan
   Kokke
   Kunzaik
   Kuywa
   Kyagan
   Kyaukkan
   Kyauktaing
   Kyauktan
   Kyaukyan
   Kyaungbyugan
   Kyibingan
   Kyigaung
   Kyiywa
   Kyungale
   Ledan
   Le-thit
   Letthamagan
   Magyizu
   Mayogon
   Mibauk
   Minnegon
   Myaukkon
   Myingyan
   Myintha
   Myogyigon
   Nabuaing
   Nanywa
   Nata
   Ngaginge
   Nyaungbin
   Nyaungbin
   Nyaungdo
   Nyaungkaya
   Nyaungwun
   Okshitkon
   Pagan
   Pauksein
   Paungbya
   Paungga
   Petbinaing
   Petyin
   Pinle
   Potokbyu
   Pyawbwe
   Pyogan
   Pyudwingon
   Sagyu
   Saka
   Shwebawgon
   Shwebontha
   Shwega
   Singut
   Sonywa
   Talôkmyo
   Tanaungdaing
   Tatywa
   Taungauk
   Taungbon
   Taunggan
   Taungshe
   Tawbu
   Taywinbo
   Tebin
   Tegyiywa
   Teinban
   Thamongaing
   Thanbo
   Thebyuwa
   Theingon
   Theinywa
   Theinywa
   Thetkekyin
   Thinbyun
   Thitpinshe
   Thityon
   Udaya
   Yandabo
   Yedaing
   Yondozwe
   Ywashe
   Ywatha
   Ywathaponywa
   Ywathaya
   Ywathit
   Ywazi
   Zalatkon
   Zibingan
   Zidaw.kula

References

Townships of Mandalay Region